Robbinsdale is a city in Hennepin County, Minnesota,. The population was 13,953 at the time of the 2010 census.

Geography

Minnesota State Highway 100 and County Road 81 are two of the main routes in the city.

History

Shortly after the Minnesota Territorial Legislative Assembly created Hennepin County in 1852, John C. Bohanon filed the first claim in the Township of Crystal Lake. Railroads didn't reach the area until 1880. A flag station was established near the farm of Alfred Parker and six years later he donated land for a depot. The community that grew around it came to be known as Parker's Station. In 1887 Minneapolis made an effort to secure more taxable property by annexing neighboring townships. In response, Crystal Lake farmers incorporated the Village of Crystal. Later that year, entrepreneur, civil war veteran, and real estate developer, Andrew B. Robbins came to Parker's Station on behalf of an Illinois business interest. Robbins was a former state senator and the brother-in-law of lumber baron, Thomas Barlow Walker. Robbins purchased 90 acres (360,000 m2) to the west of Lower Twin Lake to incorporate into the Robbinsdale Park subdivision. 
The summer of 1888 brought the first land boom. New industries moved in and a large Lutheran Seminary was built and Robbins began work on his Northern Car Company. The trolley manufacturing firm would eventually employ 150 people. In 1890 the Robbins built a 16-room Queen Anne-style mansion on Lower Twin Lake. After he moved his family in Robbins gathered investors and built the Hubbard Specialty Manufacturing Company. The firm made chairs and wheelbarrows. Despite his connections, Robbins was unable to persuade the Minneapolis Street Railway Company to extend a streetcar line up West Broadway. In 1891 he organized the North Side Street Railway Company and built his own line from the Minneapolis city limits to Robbinsdale Park. The street cars were pulled by horses until the line was converted to electricity. Robbins' development efforts led to tension between farm families and residents near the village center. A special election was held and a vote to dissolve the Village of Crystal carried unanimously. On April 19, 1893, the new 2.9 square mile village of Robbinsdale was organized.

Fawcett Publications was founded in 1919 in Robbinsdale with the publication of Captain Billy's Whiz Bang. In 1922 Fawcett introduced True Confessions magazine. The new publication, modeled on popular detective and romance pulps attracted a large female readership. In 1929 Fawcett launched Modern Mechanics. The magazine championed Yankee ingenuity and do it yourself projects. The first issue's cover line was "Build your own airplane!". Modern Mechanics was later renamed Mechanix Illustrated. Fawcett Publications eventually outgrew their offices in the Security State Bank Building on West Broadway. In 1930, the company relocated to the Sexton Building in downtown Minneapolis. The city's pulp magazine history is echoed in Robbinsdale's annual summer celebration, Whiz Bang Days.

In 1940 Dr. Samuel Samuelson built Victory Hospital on property he already owned in Robbinsdale. The original marble faced, three story building had five operating rooms and 70 beds. In 1954, Victory Hospital was reorganized as a non-profit and renamed North Memorial . Over the next 50 years North Memorial grew into 518 bed medical center. Today North Memorial Medical Center is a regional trauma center with eight helicopters, 120 ambulances, and 725 employees. North Memorial Medical Center. Besides being one of the state's Level 1 Trauma Centers, it also operates AirCare, an air medical transport service. They have five flight bases around Minnesota.

In 1951, Sidney and William Volk hired the architectural firm of Liebenberg and Kaplan to the Terrace Theatre. Situated on a rise overlooking Crystal Lake and Bottineau Boulevard, the theater is considered by many to be a masterpiece of mid-century modern design. The building's rectangular volumes originally contained a 1300-seat auditorium, an expansive lobby, sunken garden style lounge with a large copper fireplace, sweeping foyers and two snack bars.

The Terrace closed in 1999 and its out-of-state owner posted a "For Lease" sign but did not take care of the property. In May 2016 the City of Robbinsdale and State of Minnesota passed resolutions commemorating the Terrace as an important historic landmark. However, the city pursued demolition, giving rise to controversy between those who felt the theater was now a blighted property and others who wanted to reopen the Terrace as a point of community pride and a unique gathering place for music, film, and theater. A group of more than 2,000 supporters had petitioned the city to preserve and restore the theater, but area residents who wanted a nearby grocery store prevailed. After the city granted Tax Increment Financing to a developer to demolish the theater and the nearby mall and build a big box grocery store, a group of Terrace supporters filed a lawsuit to prevent demolition. The lawsuit was denied, and the theater was torn down in 2016 to be replaced by a 96,000 sq. ft. Hy-Vee grocery store.

Education
Robbinsdale is served by Robbinsdale Area Schools. There are two public schools and one parochial school located within the city limits:
 Lakeview Elementary School (PreK through 5th grade)
 Robbinsdale Middle School (6th though 8th grades)
 Sacred Heart Catholic School (PreK through 8th grade)

Demographics

2020 census 
As of the 2020 census, the population of Robbinsdale totaled 14,646 people, 6,505 households, and 2.19 people per household. The racial makeup of the city was 67.3% White, 16.4% Black or African American, 9.9% Hispanic or Latino, 4.7% Asian, 0.2% Native American, and 6.7% from two or more races. 

The population numbers for age included 21.0% aged 18 and under, 18.1% aged 65 and older, and 6.8% aged five and under.

94% of residents age 25 and older held a high school diploma or higher degree, while 36.8% of residents age 25 and older held a Bachelor's or higher degree.

2010 census
As of the census of 2010, there were 13,953 people, 6,032 households, and 3,375 families residing in the city. The racial makeup of the city was 76.5% White, 13.8% African American, 0.5% Native American, 3.3% Asian, 0.1% Pacific Islander, 1.9% from other races, and 3.9% from two or more races. Hispanic or Latino of any race were 4.6% of the population.

There were 6,032 households, of which 28.0% had children under the age of 18 living with them, 39.6% were married couples living together, 12.5% had a female householder with no husband present, 3.9% had a male householder with no wife present, and 44.0% were non-families. 35.7% of all households were made up of individuals, and 12.5% had someone living alone who was 65 years of age or older. The average household size was 2.28 and the average family size was 2.99.

The median age in the city was 36.9 years. 22% of residents were under the age of 18; 7.4% were between the ages of 18 and 24; 32.3% were from 25 to 44; 26% were from 45 to 64; and 12.4% were 65 years of age or older. The gender makeup of the city was 47.6% male and 52.4% female.

2000 census
As of the census of 2000, there were 14,123 people, 6,097 households, and 3,524 families residing in the city. The racial makeup of the city was 88.9% White, 5.7% African American, 0.6% Native American, 2.1% Asian, <0.1% Pacific Islander, 1.0% from other races, and 1.7% from two or more races. Hispanic or Latino of any race were 2.0% of the population.

There were 6,097 households, out of which 26.7% had children under the age of 18 living with them, 43.7% were married couples living together, 10.6% had a female householder with no husband present, and 42.2% were non-families. 34.2% of all households were made up of individuals, and 15.6% had someone living alone who was 65 years of age or older. The average household size was 2.26 and the average family size was 2.93.

In the city, the population was spread out, with 21.7% under the age of 18, 6.8% from 18 to 24, 34.4% from 25 to 44, 19.5% from 45 to 64, and 17.5% who were 65 years of age or older. The median age was 38 years. For every 100 females, there were 91.8 males. For every 100 females age 18 and over, there were 87.8 males.

The median income for a household in the city was $48,271, and the median income for a family was $57,185. Males had a median income of $37,406 versus $30,771 for females. The per capita income for the city was $23,912. About 2.0% of families and 4.7% of the population were below the poverty line, including 2.8% of those under age 18 and 7.0% of those age 65 or over.

Politics

The City of Robbinsdale is a Charter City establishing the "Council-Manager Plan." This means that the Robbinsdale City Council sets the policy direction and the City Manager is responsible for the administration of the city including day-to-day operations and hiring City staff. The Robbinsdale City Council made up of a Mayor and 4 Council Members. The Mayor is the presiding officer of the council. The Mayor and City Council each have equal votes on all motions. The City Manager is appointed for an indefinite period and the city manager shall be removed at the discretion of the council at any time by a three-fifths vote.

Bill Blonigan was elected Mayor in 2021 after serving as Ward 1 Council Member from 1981-2020. Regan Murphy previously served as the Mayor of Robbinsdale from 2013 until 2020.

Robbinsdale is located in Minnesota's 5th congressional district, represented by Ilhan Omar. The city is represented in the Minnesota Legislature by State Senator Ann Rest and State Representative Mike Freiberg. Jeffrey Lunde represents Robbinsdale on the Hennepin County Board of Commissioners.

Notable people

 David Backes (born 1984), National Hockey League player
 Barry Darsow (born 1959), professional wrestler (Demolition Smash, Repo Man, etc.)
 Greg Gagne (born 1948), professional wrestler and son of Verne Gagne
 Verne Gagne (1926–2015), professional wrestler and owner of the American Wrestling Association
 Dennie Gordon, film and television director
 James C. Heap (1935–2013), Minnesota state representative
 Larry Hennig (1936–2018), professional wrestler
 Curt Hennig (1958–2003), professional wrestler
 Marjorie Johnson, a popular "Blue Ribbon Baker" who has won over 2,500 fair ribbons and appeared on multiple talk shows, including The Tonight Show with Jay Leno
 Nikita Koloff (born 1959), professional wrestler – Scott Simpson 1977 graduate of RHS
 Leonard Lilyholm (born 1941), ice hockey player and architect
 Bam Neely (born 1975), professional wrestler
 Gene Okerlund (1942–2019), announcer and interviewer for the World Wrestling Federation and World Championship Wrestling
 Mike Opat (born 1961), politician, Hennepin County Commissioner for District 1 since 1992 and current chair of the Hennepin County Board
 Brady Boone (1958–1998), professional wrestler, who competed with WCW and WWF as Brady Boone & Battle Kat
 Alec Richards (born 1987), professional ice hockey player (goaltender), Chicago Blackhawks
 Rick Rude (1958–1999), professional wrestler, who competed with NWA, WCW, and WWF; 1976 graduate
 Kathryn Leigh Scott (born 1943), Playboy Bunny turned actress who appeared on American Broadcasting Company soap opera Dark Shadows
 Tim Vakoc (1960–2009), first U.S. military chaplain to die from wounds received in the Iraq War
 Bee Vang (born 1991), actor in Gran Torino
 Blake Wheeler (born 1986), forward for the Winnipeg Jets of the National Hockey League
 Steve Zahn (born 1967), actor, attended Robbinsdale Cooper High School; appeared in Rescue Dawn and Riding in Cars with Boys
 Tom Zenk (1958–2017), professional wrestler, who competed with NWA, WCW, and WWF

References

External links

 "The Robbinsdale Historical Society"
 City website

Cities in Hennepin County, Minnesota
Cities in Minnesota
Populated places established in 1893
1893 establishments in Minnesota